Danesh Kumar is a Pakistani politician who was elected member for the Provincial Assembly of Balochistan.

Political career
He was elected to Provincial Assembly of Balochistan on a reserved seat for minorities in 2018 Pakistani general election representing Balochistan Awami Party
Currently serving in senate of Pakistan

References

Living people
Balochistan Awami Party MPAs (Balochistan)
Politicians from Balochistan, Pakistan
Pakistani Hindus
1976 births